Puengasí is a hill towards the southeast of the center of the city of Quito, Pichincha Province, Ecuador, across Machángara River, and southeast of Itchimbía. It is northwest of the rural parish Conocoto.

External links

Hills of Ecuador
Parishes of Quito Canton
Quito
Geography of Pichincha Province